Jonathan Holmes is an English-born Australian television journalist, actor and producer who was the presenter of the ABC1 weekly programme Media Watch from 2008 until July 2013.

Career 
His television career began in 1971 at the current affairs department of the BBC in Britain, until he was hired by the Australian Broadcasting Corporation in 1982 to become the executive producer of Four Corners, the ABC's flagship current affairs programme. He was executive producer of Four Corners from 1982 to 1985, of Foreign Correspondent (1992–93), and The 7.30 Report (2001–02). From 1998 to 2000, he was the ABC's foreign correspondent in Washington, D.C. He returned to Four Corners as a reporter in January 2003.

In 1988, he wrote, produced and narrated the award-winning documentary film Hoddle Street, about the 1987 Hoddle Street massacre.

 Holmes is a media columnist for The Age and Sydney Morning Herald.

Awards and honours
 Finalist in the Walkley Awards four times.
 Banff World Television Festival top prize 1988 for Hoddle Street.
 Holmes won a 1998 Logie Award for a Foreign Correspondent TV special report on the Balibo Five (with assistant producer Jill Jolliffe).
 Awarded Silver Award "for sustained excellence over a quarter of a century" by the United Nations Association of Australia (2003).

References

Australian television journalists
Australian television presenters
Australian television producers
BBC television producers
Australian expatriate journalists in the United States
British emigrants to Australia
Naturalised citizens of Australia
Living people
Year of birth missing (living people)
Place of birth missing (living people)